Kelsey Harshman (born November 10, 1996) is a Canadian softball player of American descent.

Career
Harshman was part of the bronze medal winning team at the 2018 Women's Softball World Championship. She played collegiate softball for the Wisconsin Badgers.

In June 2021, Harshman was named to Canada's 2020 Olympic team.

References

1996 births
Living people
Canadian softball players
Canadian people of American descent
Competitors at the 2022 World Games
Medalists at the 2020 Summer Olympics
Olympic softball players of Canada
Olympic bronze medalists for Canada
Olympic medalists in softball
Sportspeople from Tucson, Arizona
Softball players from Arizona
Softball players at the 2020 Summer Olympics
Wisconsin Badgers softball players